Synclisia is a genus of flowering plants belonging to the family Menispermaceae.

Its native range is Africa.

Species:

Synclisia scabrida

References

Menispermaceae
Menispermaceae genera